Lauri Nurkse (born 11 May 1978) is a Finnish actor and film director. He contributed to more than twenty films since 2001.

Selected filmography

References

External links 

1978 births
Living people
Finnish male film actors
Finnish film directors